All's Faire in Love is a 2009 romantic comedy film directed by Scott Marshall and written by R. A. White and Jeffrey Ray Wine. The film stars Owen Benjamin as Will, a college student who is assigned to work at a renaissance fair by his professor (Cedric the Entertainer) after missing several classes, and Christina Ricci as Kate, an investment banker who leaves her job to work at the fair.

The film was shot primarily at the Michigan Renaissance Festival. Local residents, costumed participants and fairegoers were used as extras.

The film was originally titled Ye Olde Times but was renamed in late September 2008. Jack Black and Lindsay Lohan were attached at one point to star in the film.

Cast 
Owen Benjamin as Will
Christina Ricci as Kate
Louise Griffiths as Jo
Chris Wylde as Prince Rank
Cedric the Entertainer as Professor Shockworthy
Matthew Lillard as Crockett
Ann-Margret as Mrs. Banks
Martin Klebba as Count Le Petite
Sandra Taylor as Princess Jeanette
Bill Engvall as Mr. Mendelson
Dave Sheridan as Jester Roy / Horny
Peter Ransom as General Tsoe

Production
In May 2007, it was announced that Jack Black, Tim Robbins, Cary Elwes, Will Arnett and John C. Reilly are attached to star in a romantic comedy called Ye Olde Times, with R.A. White making his directorial debut based on a screenplay he also wrote. In November 2007, it was reported that Matthew Lillard, Orlando Jones and David Arquette joined the cast of the film, Justin Chatwin being attached to star as the male lead. In March 2008, it was revealed that Lindsay Lohan is on board to play the female lead in the film. In September 2008, it was announced that Owen Benjamin, Christina Ricci and Cedric the Entertainer stepped in to replace Chatwin, Lohan and Black respectively, Bill Engvall, Louise Griffiths and Ann-Margret joining the cast in supporting roles. It was also reported that Scott Marshall will replace R.A. White as director, the film being renamed All's Faire in Love.

Release 
The North American premiere was at the SoCal Independent Film Festival on September 9, 2009 in Huntington Beach, CA. The film premiered on the grounds of the Michigan Renaissance Festival on September 30, 2009. Two years later, the film was released to Regal Entertainment theaters on October 28, 2011.

References

External links
 
 

American romantic comedy films
Renaissance fair
2009 films
2009 romantic comedy films
Films shot in Michigan
Films directed by Scott Marshall
2000s English-language films
2000s American films